is a train station located in Asahikawa, Hokkaidō, Japan. It is operated by the Hokkaido Railway Company. Only local trains stop. The station is assigned station number F29.

Lines serviced
Furano Line

Surrounding Area
  Route 237

External links
Station information by JR Hokkaido Asahikawa Branch 

Railway stations in Hokkaido Prefecture
Railway stations in Japan opened in 1958
Buildings and structures in Asahikawa